The Dhanu is a river in Bangladesh.

The Dhanu, also called the Ghorautra, is a tributary of the Meghna. It flows directly southwards from Sunamganj in Sylhet through the
eastern thanas of Netrakona and Kishoreganj of Mymensingh Region. It is navigable
year-round. It falls and rises with the daily tides and even the canals connected with it a long way inland, at places like Gag Bazar and Badla, experience the effect of these tides.

Rivers of Bangladesh
Rivers of Sylhet Division